Cousins Maine Lobster is a franchise food truck business based in Los Angeles, California. In addition to food truck locations in Southern California, it has franchise locations throughout the United States.

History

The idea for Cousins Maine Lobster came in 2011 when cousins Jim Tselikis and Sabin Lomac were discussing food they used to eat while growing up in Portland, Maine. Impressed with the Los Angeles food truck industry, they decided to start selling Maine lobster in the L.A. area. The first truck opened in 2012 and by 2014 had four trucks in Southern California and signed up 10 franchisees in locations throughout the United States. The company received an investment of $55,000 from Barbara Corcoran after appearing on Shark Tank in 2012.

Cousins opened its first brick-and-mortar location in 2015 in West Hollywood with additional menu items not found on the food trucks. At the time of the store opening, the company was operating 15 food trucks in 11 cities, and 26 trucks in 13 states by 2017.
In April 2018, the Cousins published an ebook in the hope of inspiring other entrepreneurs to start a business, and not lose hope.

On April 11, 2021, Jim Tselikis and Sabin Lomac's new show, "Food Truck Rehab" premiered on The Food Network.

See also
 List of food trucks

References

Sources
 
 
 
 Exclusive interview The Scope Weekly: How a Shark Tank investor and two Maine natives forged an incredible partnership, transforming a lobster roll food truck into a nationwide seafood enterprise. March 14, 2018 Barbara Corcoran & Cousins Maine Lobster: How a Lobster Roll Food Truck Became An Enterprise. Cousins Maine Lobster’s Inspirational Book: Speaking with Sabin Lomac and Jim Tselikis

Further reading

External links 

 

Companies based in Los Angeles
Food trucks
Restaurants established in 2012